Spectamen ordo is an extinct species of sea snail, a marine gastropod mollusk, in the family Solariellidae.

Distribution
This marine species occurs in New Zealand.

References

External links
  Laws, C.R. (1941) The molluscan faunule at Pakaurangi Point, Kaipara. No. 2. Transactions of the Royal Society of New Zealand, 71, 134-151, pls. 16-19.
 Williams S.T., Kano Y., Warén A. & Herbert D.G. (2020). Marrying molecules and morphology: first steps towards a reevaluation of solariellid genera (Gastropoda: Trochoidea) in the light of molecular phylogenetic studies. Journal of Molluscan Studies. 86(1): 1–26

Solariellidae